JFK: 3 Shots That Changed America is an American historical documentary about the assassination of President John F. Kennedy. It premiered on The History Channel on Sunday, October 11, 2009 and was released on DVD on January 26, 2010.

Overview
The film is an unnarrated collection of archived news and home movie footage shot as events unfolded, some of it rarely seen. Part one deals with the time from President Kennedy's arrival in Dallas on November 22, 1963 through the murder of Lee Harvey Oswald less than 48 hours later.

Part two deals with the Warren Commission, its critics and those who suspect a conspiracy, the assassinations of Martin Luther King Jr. and Robert F. Kennedy in 1968 and the turmoil that followed, and the continuing doubt about the assassinations and the effects this has had on American society.

Awards
The film won the FOCAL International Award for Best Use of Footage In Factual Productions.

References

External links
 

2009 television films
2009 films
2009 documentary films
American documentary films
American black-and-white films
Documentary films about conspiracy theories
Documentary films about the assassination of John F. Kennedy
History (American TV channel) original programming
2000s English-language films
2000s American films